Toxic Crusaders refers to a series of side-scrolling, beat 'em up, shoot 'em up platform video games based on the American cartoon series Toxic Crusaders (1991), and Troma Entertainment's 1984 film The Toxic Avenger. The games were developed for the Nintendo Entertainment System, Game Boy and Sega Genesis, respectively by TOSE, Realtime Associates, and Infogrames, and released in 1992. Bandai released the NES and Game Boy games, while Sega handled the Genesis game. A Super NES version was planned by Bandai around at the same time with the NES and Game Boy versions but it was never released for unknown reasons. The Game Boy version is a rare collector's item, fetching prices of up to US$500 on auction sites for a complete copy.

On April 30, 2013, Lloyd Kaufman, the director of the film that the game was based on, appeared on an episode of Angry Video Game Nerd, reviewing the video game Toxic Crusaders on various consoles. Kaufman also appears in Angry Video Game Nerd: The Movie as himself, and was interviewed by James Rolfe.

References

External links

1992 video games
Bandai games
Beat 'em ups
Game Boy games
Nintendo Entertainment System games
Platform games
Science fiction video games
Sega Genesis games
Side-scrolling video games
Video games based on animated television series
Video games set in the United States
The Toxic Avenger (franchise)
Tose (company) games
Sega beat 'em ups
Infogrames games
Realtime Associates games
Video games developed in France
Video games developed in Japan
Video games developed in the United States